Paul Arnold Clarke (born 1975 in Northampton), and better known as DJ Dougal, is a British UK hardcore and happy hardcore artist and DJ.

He first became involved with the dance music scene at the age of 15, while setting up sound systems for some of the first acid house parties, as part of work experience assignment to a music shop. Through this, he met Murray Beetson (of ESP Promotions and promoter of the Dreamscape raves) and became a resident at raves including Equinox Milwaukees, Dreamscape and Helter Skelter.

His style is a mix of euphoric hardcore with uplifting vocals. He has worked alongside many other hardcore artists including DNA, Gammer and Hixxy, though in recent years, most of his work has been with Gammer. Several years ago, he – along with Hixxy – created the successful label Essential Platinum, which has had many releases. An extensive amount of his work has been featured in the Bonkers CD series, who he has consistently mixed for.

The Bonkers 3 compilation, CD3 of which Dougal mixed, went gold in the UK and a special edition of the compilation was released to commemorate it. Five of the Bonkers compilations that have his contribution have gone top 20 on the UK compilations chart.

DJ Dougal performed on the Dance Nation UK Live Tour in April 2009 along with artists such as Basshunter, Sash! and September.

He has also appeared on the Dancemania series, including its Speed sub-series such as its first issue where he appeared with three tracks.

References

External links

Living people
British DJs
Happy hardcore musicians
1975 births
UK hardcore musicians
Monstercat artists